Equality Michigan is an American civil rights, advocacy and anti-violence organization serving Michigan's lesbian, gay, bisexual and transgender (LGBT) community. Equality Michigan serves Michigan's LGBT community through victims services, lobbying on behalf of the LGBT community, public education on LGBT issues, and organizing Michigan's largest LGBT events such as Motor City Pride. The organization is a founding member of the Equality Federation.

History
In 1991, the Triangle Foundation was founded by Jeffrey Montgomery, Henry D. Messer, and John Monahan as an anti-violence organization. Triangle Foundation expanded its mission in 1994 to include political and policy work following the closure of the Michigan Organization for Human Rights. Michigan Equality was founded by activist Beth Bashert in 1999, following successful electoral campaign efforts in support of LGBT rights in seven Michigan cities, including Ypsilanti, Kalamazoo, Traverse City, Huntington Woods, and others.  Triangle Foundation merged with Michigan Equality to create Equality Michigan in 2010.

Structure

Equality Michigan, a 501(c)(3) nonprofit organization, is the primary organization using the Equality Michigan brand. Equality Michigan Action Fund is a 501(c)(4) nonprofit organization affiliated with, but independent from, Equality Michigan. The Equality Michigan Pride PAC is a political action committee (PAC) affiliated with, but independent from, the Equality Michigan Action Fund.

Victim services program
Equality Michigan's Victim Services Program documents and addresses the pervasive problem of violence committed against the actual or perceived LGBT and HIV-affected communities. Victim Services offers free and confidential support to victims of bias crimes, domestic violence, pick-up crimes, police misconduct, HIV-related violence, rape, and sexual assault. In addition, Equality Michigan provides accompaniments and advocacy for clients with the police, the courts, medical, and social service agencies. The organization works to get legal services offered at a reduced fee for low-income clients and help clients tell their story in order to raise awareness about the incidents that occurred to them. Data collected through this program is published annually through the National Coalition of Anti-Violence Programs - which Triangle Foundation co-founded.

Policy program
Equality Michigan works to enact policy and legislative changes in Michigan to promote equality for LGBT people in such areas as housing and employment, prevent hate crimes, and to stop anti-LGBT legislation and similar measures from being introduced.

Community events
Equality Michigan's community events are intended to bring together and build the Michigan LGBT community.

Motor City Pride

An annual Pride street festival held in Hart Plaza in Detroit, Michigan the second Saturday and Sunday of every June to celebrate the LGBT community. Previously held in Ferndale, Michigan, the festival moved to Detroit in 2011. It is the largest LGBT event held in Michigan. The event showcases both local and national performers including Nickki Stevens, The Fundamentals.

Michigan LGBT ComedyFest
ComedyFest is an annual comedy festival featuring national comedians held in Dearborn, Michigan for the LGBT community. Comedians performing have included Sean Hetherington (2005), René Hicks (2006), Ian Harvie (2009), and Julie Goldman (2014).

Equality Michigan Annual Dinner Event
Equality Michigan's Annual Dinner Event begins with a cocktail reception with a silent auction. The dinner features a keynote speaker and the presentation of "Catalyst Awards" recognizing individuals and organizations for excellence in service to Michigan's LGBT community. The event is attended by several community leaders and elected officials. Past speakers have included:

Education and outreach
Equality Michigan provides diversity trainings on social and political LGBT issues. This program also educates politicians, doctors, lawyers, teachers, and law enforcement professionals about issues related to the LGBT community.

Catalyst Awards
Each year at their annual dinner, the organization presents awards, called Catalyst Awards, to individuals, groups or organizations advocating for LGBT persons in Michigan. Some awards named after individuals, such as the Henry D. Messer Youth Activist Award, are given multiple years to honor specific types of actions.

Past Catalyst Award recipients
Some past recipients of a Catalyst Award include:

See also

 LGBT rights in Michigan
 LGBT history in Michigan
 Same-sex marriage in Michigan
 List of LGBT rights organizations

References

External links
 Equality Michigan website
 Motor City Pride
 Lesbian and Gay ComedyFest

LGBT political advocacy groups in Michigan
Political organizations established in 1991
1991 establishments in Michigan
Nonviolence organizations based in the United States
Organizations based in Detroit
Charities based in Michigan
Equality Federation